Kshana Kshanam is a 1991 Indian Telugu-language road thriller and heist film written and directed by Ram Gopal Varma. The film stars Venkatesh, Sridevi, Paresh Rawal, and Rami Reddy. The plot follows Satya (Sridevi), a young woman who is hounded by a gang of robbers headed by Nayyar (Rawal) and the police. With the help of a pickpocketer Chandu (Venkatesh), she escapes into the forests.

Varma introduced road movie and film noir to Indian screen with Kshana Kshanam. Varma experimented with close-to-life performances by the lead actors, which bought a rather fictional storyline a sense of authenticity at a time when the industry was being filled with unnecessary commercial fillers. 

Featured at the Ann Arbor Film Festival, and the Fribourg Festival, it went on to gather a cult following.
It won five state Nandi Awards, including Best Direction, Best Screenplay, and a Filmfare Award for Best Actress – Telugu to Sridevi. Varma later adapted Kshana Kshanam in Hindi as Daud, and produced road movies such as Thiruda Thiruda, Anaganaga Oka Roju and Road.

Plot
Narayana and his accomplice, working for Nayar, break into a bank in Hyderabad and rob . Found out by the police, the group engages in a shootout and later a chase, during which one of the gang members and the policemen are killed. Narayana, going rogue, kills his accomplice and betrays Nayar, hoping to keep the loot for himself. With the police watching all routes out of Hyderabad, Nayar and his men track Narayana to his brother's photo studio. Before he gets caught, Narayana hides the clue to where he hid the money in one of the photo envelopes.

Caught and tortured, Narayana reveals the clue, but before they can retrieve it, the envelope is taken by Satya, a middle-class working girl. Before dying, Narayana reveals the truth and the clue to his brother. Heading home, Satya is accosted by one of Nayar's men, who demand the envelope. Trying to escape, Satya accidentally stabs him, after which her nosy neighbor calls the police on her. While on the phone, the thug gets up again, only to fall dead, a knife lodged in his back, which later is shown as being thrown by Narayan's brother.

Meanwhile, Chandu is a small-time thief posing as a police officer to con and steal from people. While relaxing at a Dhaba, Satya enters the place and calls her friend to inform her about what happened, unaware that the police were listening in. Chandu inadvertently saves her from being assaulted by a gang of hoodlums, and while she is thanking him, the police arrive. Thinking that they are after him, Chandu takes Satya hostage and escapes into the jungle with her. Meanwhile, Nayar and his men also join the pursuit.

Chandu and Satya face a few challenges in avoiding the police, Narayana's brother, and Nayar in the forest, gradually growing closer to each other. They run into Nayar, where he demands to know where the envelope is. Escaping the police led by Inspector Yadav and Narayana's brother, Chandu deduces that the clue to the money is hidden in that envelope. They eventually stumble across Nayar's truck, which they use to escape the jungle and into the city. Knowing that Satya's apartment is a crime scene and will be guarded, Chandu and Satya decide to scale the building from outside through her neighbor's apartment.

They eventually find the envelope, which contains a storage receipt for the cloakroom at the railway station. Evading Nayar's henchmen and the police, Chandu and Satya face off against one of Nayar's henchmen at Chandu's apartment and tie him up. While Chandu goes off to meet his friend and decide what to do with the money they found, Satya is left to guard the henchman, who breaks free and subdues her, then calls Nayar. Chandu decides to keep half the money and return the rest but is ambushed by Nayar's henchmen and brought to his apartment, where he is forced to hand over the receipt.

However, the police are tipped off to their location by a police informant, and a shootout ensues. Chandu manages to subdue Nayar and get the receipt, and they head for the station with Nayar and the police in pursuit. The duo reaches the station and retrieves the money bag. They then climb the train to escape Nayar. At the next station, Nayar and his men board the train, leading to a fight between Chandu and the goons. Left with Nayar and one of his men, Nayar holds Chandu and Satya at gunpoint, demanding the money.

In response, Chandu hangs the bag over the side, threatening to drop it if he shoots. Left with no options, Nayar decides to have the train stopped so that he can shoot them and retrieve the money, only for his henchman and the train driver to struggle and fall out of the train. Chandu unhooks the engine from the rest of the train, jumping back to grab the bag and jump off. With the engine out of control, it plows through many houses before finally ramming a wall and slowing down. Nayar is arrested by the police, and Chandu returns the money to Yadav, after being forced to do so by Satya. The film ends with Satya asking Chandru to drop her home, offering to introduce him to her mother, and an amused Chandu agreeing.

Cast
  Venkatesh as Chandu
  Sridevi as Satya
  Paresh Rawal as Nayar 
  Rami Reddy as Inspector Yadav
  Brahmanandam as Store Manager
  Narsing Yadav as Narsing
 Hema as Sarala
  Horse Babu as Narayana
 Jack Gaud as Ungan

Production
Bijon Das Gupta was the production designer for the film. Filming was done in Hyderabad, Nallamala forests, and Mudumalai National Park. Sridevi's character was named after Satya, a woman who Ram Gopal Varma used to love in college who did not love him back. The song "Kingu La Kanipisthunnadu" was shot in The Leela Mumbai.

Soundtrack

Music composed by M. M. Keeravani. The song Jaamu Raatiri written by Sirivennela Seetharama Sastry with vocals by S. P. Balasubrahmanyam and K. S. Chithra is considered  as an evergreen song. It was released on 13 August 1990. Rekindled version of the song was released on 23 August 2019 through Vel Records. Vedala Hemachandra, Kaala Bhairava, Manisha Eerabathini, Deepu, Damini, Mounima, Shruthi, Noel Sean and Prudhvi Chandhra have performed the vocals of the song.

Release
Kshana Kshanam was released on 9 October 1991. The film was dubbed and released in Tamil as Ennamo Nadakudhu and in Hindi as Hairaan in October 1992.

Reception
Griddaluru Gopalrao of Zamin Ryot wrote his review on 18 October 1991, appreciating the performances of the lead cast and the action sequences. Gopalrao, however, opined that the writing could have been better. He felt that the suspense was diluted because the audience is fed with the details which the characters themselves are not aware of. On 16 October 1992, Malini Mannath of The Indian Express termed the film a "comic-thriller." She wrote that "The climax scene on a train has been superbly directed."

In July 2020, The News Minute Balakrishna Ganeshan opined that the Kshana Kshanam tells the story from a female perspective which is rare in Indian cinema, however, he added that the film still suffers from male saviour complex. On the performance of the lead cast, he wrote: "Sridevi and Venkatesh are understated and subtle in their respective performances." Appreciating the cinematography, he stated: "S Gopal Reddy's cinematography too deserves mention. The film has a lot of top angle shots during the chasing sequences, which establish the chaos and keep the film fast-paced."

The soundtrack and score were composed by M. M. Keeravani received positive reviews. The narrative by Varma and the cinematography by S. Gopala Reddy were appreciated.

Awards
Nandi Awards
 Best Director - Ram Gopal Varma
 Best Actress - Sridevi
 Best Screenplay Writer - Ram Gopal Varma
 Best Cinematographer - S. Gopala Reddy
 Best Editor - Shankar

Filmfare Awards South
 Best Actress – Telugu - Sridevi
 Best Music Director - Telugu - M. M. Keeravani

References

External links

1991 action thriller films
1990s avant-garde and experimental films
1990s comedy road movies
1990s comedy thriller films
1990s chase films
1990s heist films
1991 films
Films about bank robbery
Films about contract killing
Films directed by Ram Gopal Varma
Films scored by M. M. Keeravani
Films shot in Ooty
Indian avant-garde and experimental films
Indian chase films
Indian comedy thriller films
Indian heist films
Indian neo-noir films
Indian nonlinear narrative films
Indian comedy road movies
Indian drama road movies
Telugu films remade in other languages
1990s Telugu-language films
Fictional portrayals of the Andhra Pradesh Police